Speed limits in the Czech Republic vary depending on the type of road, and whether the road is within a settlement or not. Various other special restrictions are applied for certain types and weight categories of vehicle.

Historical speed limits
On 29 January 1900, a government ordinance limited the speed of vehicles inside settlements to the velocity of a hand-cantering horse. However, public buses could ask for an exception.

An ordinance introduced in 1953 specified places where speed needs to be slow, i.e. under 15 km/h: along processions, at pedestrian crossings, while the driver is entering the road, near buses or trams, near work places, while the road is oily or while pedestrian traffic is dense.

Also, in 1966, motorcycles were limited to 80 km/h. Long-distance buses were freed from limits. Towed automobiles were limited to 50 km/h.

Speed limits were abolished on motorways (dálnice), even for trucks and motorcycles, in 1971. The special limits for motorcycles, trucks and buses were repealed. The ordinance in 1979 was the first to limit speeds outside of settlements. The limit of 60 km/h (only between 5 a.m. and 11 p.m.) was kept for roads inside settlements.

The speed inside settlements was limited  and 80 km/h on motorways, including at night. Specially signed pedestrian zones and house zones was introduced with a  limit.

Current speed limits 
In settlements, the speed limit is set to  both on motorways and roads for motorcars.

Minimum speed limits 
No minimum speed limits are currently in place.

References

Czech Republic
Transport in the Czech Republic